Winchburgh railway station served the village of Winchburgh, West Lothian, Scotland from 1842 to 1930 on the Edinburgh and Glasgow Railway.

History 
The station opened on 21 February 1842 by the Edinburgh and Glasgow Railway. To the west was Winchburgh Brick Works which was served from the north. The signal box opened in 1886 but was only open for nine years, closing in 1895. The station closed on 22 September 1930.

Reopening 
In 2021, Transport Scotland committed to rebuilding the station at Winchburgh.

References

External links 

Disused railway stations in West Lothian
Railway stations in Great Britain opened in 1842
Railway stations in Great Britain closed in 1930
1842 establishments in Scotland
1930 disestablishments in Scotland
Former North British Railway stations